Newtown is a predominantly African American community in Sarasota, Florida. Emma E. Booker Elementary, Booker Middle School, and Booker High School are in Newtown and named for educator Emma E. Booker. A farmer's market has been held in Newtown. A historical marker commemorates the community's history. Historical trolley tours have been offered along the Newtown African American Heritage Trail by the Newtown Alive organization. The Rosemary Cemetery where Owen Burns is buried is nearby and the Robert L. Taylor Complex is in Newtown.

History
Newtown was preceded by Angola and Overtown, both areas African Americans were forced out of. Newtown Plat was filed with Manatee County April 20, 1914 and included 96 building lots. On August 6, 1914, an addition was added creating an additional 74 lots.

Segregation excluded African Americans from area beaches. In 1951, Newtown residents organized wade-ins to protest their exclusion from Lido Beach and other areas.

In 2011, two British tourists were murdered in the area drawing media coverage.

In 2021, Sarasota County sought to develop an area of Newtown with multi-family housing.

References

Sarasota, Florida